Michael Robert Verstegen (born October 24, 1971 in Appleton, Wisconsin) is a former professional American football offensive lineman in the National Football League. He graduated from Kimberly High School in Kimberly, Wisconsin. He was with the New Orleans Saints (1995–1997) and the St. Louis Rams (1998). He played at the collegiate level at the University of Wisconsin–Madison.

See also
List of New Orleans Saints players

References

1971 births
Living people
Sportspeople from Appleton, Wisconsin
People from Kimberly, Wisconsin
Players of American football from Wisconsin
American football offensive guards
Wisconsin Badgers football players
New Orleans Saints players
St. Louis Rams players